Halvard Magne Kausland (25 April 1945 – 21 December 2017) was a Norwegian jazz guitarist and civil servant.

Biography 
He hails from Sund. He has his education from the Norges kommunal- og sosialhøgskole, Agder Regional College and the University of Bergen. On 20 September 1996 it was announced that Kausland had been appointed as acting director of the Arts Council Norway from 1 November 1996 to 31 March 2000; however, Kausland withdrew three days before actually assuming the post. He was later chief administrative officer of Vestfold County Municipality.

Kausland is also a well-known jazz guitarist, having played in the band of Ole Paus among other things.

From 1966 to 1979 he was married to Grethe Kausland. She did not revert to her maiden name Nilsen after the end of the marriage, but kept the name Kausland. Halvard Kausland later married artist Helle Brunvoll, with whom he also released the jazz albums In Our House (2009), Your Song (2012) and Latitude (2015).

Kausland died of cancer in Oslo on 21 December 2017 at the age of 72.

Discography (in selection)

Solo albums 
Within Kausland/Mathisen Quartet
2002: Good Bait (Hot Club)

With Helle Brunvoll
2009: In Our (Naxos)
2012: Your Song (Naxos)
2015: Latitude (Naxos)

Collaborations 
With Øystein Sunde
1974: Ikke Bare Tyll (Philips)

With Ole Paus
1976: I Anstendighetens Navn (Sonet)

References

External links 
Grethe, “Lille Grethe” Kausland at Norsk Biografisk Leksikon (In Norwegian)

1945 births
2017 deaths
Norwegian civil servants
Norwegian jazz guitarists
Musicians from Sund, Norway
University of Bergen alumni
Deaths from cancer in Norway